Barakat Al-Sharji (born 5 August 1967) is an Omani sprinter. He competed in the men's 4 × 400 metres relay at the 1984 Summer Olympics.

References

1967 births
Living people
Athletes (track and field) at the 1984 Summer Olympics
Omani male sprinters
Omani male middle-distance runners
Olympic athletes of Oman
Place of birth missing (living people)